Xavier Noiret-Thomé (born 2 February 1971 in Charleville-Mézières, Ardennes) is a French painter.

After completing his study of  Fine Arts in Rennes in 1995,  Xavier Noiret-Thomé spent some time in the Contemporary Art Centre of Domaine de Kerguehennec. From 1996 to 1997, he lived in the residence of Rijksakademie Van Beeldende Kunsten in Amsterdam. In 1999, he got an atelier at the Paul Gauguin Museum, in Pont-Aven. In 2001 he was awarded the Prijs van de Jonge Belgische Schilderkunst (Young Belgian painter prize) by the Académie Royale des Beaux-Arts of Brussels. In 2005 he was chosen by the French Academy in Rome to spend some time in the Villa Médicis. Since 2000, he has worked in Charleville-Mézières and Brussels.

Bibliography
1993 : Denys Zacharopoulos, La grandeur inconnue ('Unknown Grandeur'), in Domaine 1993, Ghent, La Chambre
1994 : Denys Zacharopoulos, Praxis ('Practice'), in Domaine 1994, Gand, La Chambre
1999 : Jean Miniac, Douze études tableaux pour un paysage perdu ('Twelve studies for a lost landscape'), illustrated by Xavier Noiret-Thomé, Éditions Rencontre, Charleville
2000 : Jean Miniac, Chroniques des esprits, illustrations de Xavier Noiret-Thomé, Paris, Dumerchez
2000 : Denys Zacharopoulos, « La question de la peinture», Dépaysement, Deurle, Musée Dhondt-Dhaenens
2001 : Denys Zacharopoulos, « L'énigme de la figure », in Prix de la Jeune Peinture Belge 2001, Antwerp, Fonds Mercator
2002 : Jean-Marc Huitorel, «Xavier Noiret-Thomé», in collection Insert, Brussels, La Lettre Volée
2003 : Hans Theys, « L'Olympe est un Mont à Charleville-Mézières », in Voir en Peinture, Brussels, La Lettre Volée
2004 : Philippe Braem, in catalogue d’exposition No friture, Heidelberg, Das Wunderhorn
2004 : « De leur temps, collections privées françaises », catalogue d’exposition, Musée des Beaux-Arts de Tourcoing, l’ADIAF
2004 : « CÉLÉBRATION!  20 ans du Frac Champagne-Ardenne », Reims, Le  Collège Editions / Frac Champagne-Ardenne
2005 : Danielle Orhan, « Harmonies et chaos : la peinture comme rapport de forces », in (suite), Brussels, La Lettre Volée

Individual exhibitions
 1989 :  « Idiosycrasie-Idiopathique », Galerie Futur-Interieur, Charleville-Mézières
 1995 : Centre d'Art Contemporain de la Ferme du Buisson, Noisiel
 2001 : Galerie-1, Fondation pour l'Architecture, Brussels
 2001 : Galerie Catherine Bastide, Brussels
 2002 : Musée Arthur Rimbaud, Charleville-Mézières
 2002 : « Cycles », Galerie Jennifer Flay, París
 2003 :« Chroniques/Chromiques «, Galerie Baronian Francey Brussels
 2004 : « Hypermnésique», Galerie Philippe Casini, París
 2004 :  « Nouvelles Peinture », Galerie Léa Gredt, Luxembourg
 2005 : Galerie Tanit, Munich
 2005 : « Pour un concept d'espace-temps», con Michel François, Fri-Art, Fribourg
 2007:  « Recent paintings and sculptures », Galerie Baronian- Francey, Bruxelles
 2009 : « The Cannibal Parade », galerie Les Filles du Calvaire, Paris
 2020 : « Panorama », Centrale for Contemporary Art, Bruxelles

General exhibitions
 1993 : « La grandeur inconnue », Domaine de Kerguéhennec, Bignan
 1994 : « Praxis », Domaine de Kerguéhennec, Bignan
 1996 : « Paint », Galerij Tanya Rumpf, Haarlem
 1996 : « Open Atelier », Rijksakademie van Beeldende Kunsten, Amsterdam
 1997 : « Printemps », École Régionale des Beaux-Arts, Rennes
 1997 : Biennale du Montenegro, Cétinié
 1997 : « Travaux d'artistes », Alliance française, Rotterdam
 1997 : « Open Atelier », Rijksakademie van Beeldende Kunsten, Amsterdam
 1998 : « Les objets contiennent l'infini », Domaine de Kerguéhennec, Bignan
 1999 : « In Situ », ORCCA, Reims
 2000 : « Dépaysement I », Domaine de Kerguéhennec, Bignan
 2000 : « Dépaysement II », Museum Dhondt-Dhaenens, Deurle
 2000 : « Nouvelles acquisitions », Frac Champagne-Ardennes, Reims
 2001 : « De la couleur », Musée d'Art Moderne de la ville de Troyes, Troyes
 2001 : « Ici et Maintenant », Tour & Taxis, Brussels
 2001 : « Prix de la Jeune Peinture Belge », Centre for Fine Arts, Brussels
 2002 : « Family Plot », Galerie Baronian-Francey, Brussels
 2002 : « Looking at Painting I », Galerie Tanit, Munich
 2003 : « Voir en peinture », Centre d'Art Contemporain Le Plateau, Paris
 2003 : «932 m³», OPALC, Amberes
 2004 : « Voir en peinture II », Zamek, Warsaw
 2004 : « Love is in the air », Matrix art project, Brussels
 2004 : « Grosse, Majerus, Scheibitz, Noiret-Thomé », Galerie Baronian-Francey, Brussels
 2004 : « De leur temps, jeunes collections françaises », Musée des Beaux-Arts de Tourcoing
 2004 : « No friture », Kunstverein Ludwigshafen, Mannheimer Kunstverein
 2005 : Musée des Beaux-Art de Tourcoing, Tourcoing
 2005 : "Plat pays en 3 dimensions", Galerie Philippe Casini, Paris

References

External links
 Personal site

1971 births
Living people
People from Charleville-Mézières
20th-century French painters
20th-century French male artists
French male painters
21st-century French painters
21st-century French male artists